Federal law bans smoking in all Australian Commonwealth government buildings, public transport, airports, and international and domestic flights. Australia banned smoking  on domestic flights in December 1987, on international flights within Australian airspace in 1990, and in 1996 banned smoking on all Australian international flights.

Further bans are in place but are governed by individual states. Currently all Australian states and territories have banned smoking in vehicles with children, in some enclosed public places, particularly most major company-owned workplaces, and most enclosed restaurants. Tobacco products cannot be sold or supplied to persons under 18 years old, but there is no legal age to use them.

The Australian Government has made very few laws on electronic cigarettes and leaves such policy up to the states.

States and territories

Australian Capital Territory
On 6 December 1995, the Australian Capital Territory (ACT) banned smoking in cafes and restaurants, the first jurisdiction in Australia to do so. Since 1 December 2006 a smoking ban has applied to all enclosed public places.

The laws were extended to prohibit smoking in most outdoor eating areas starting in December 2010. Exceptions to this rule can be made but only under certain guidelines. A "Designated Outdoor Smoking Area" (DOSA) requirements include; may not encompass more than 50% of the outdoor area, must be separated from smoke-free areas by no less than 4 metres or a non-transparent fixed wall barrier at least 3 metres high.

New South Wales

On 6 September 2001, New South Wales banned smoking in enclosed public areas, except for bars and licensed premises. The Government introduced a total "enclosed space" ban in New South Wales on 1 July 2007. A public place is considered substantially enclosed only if the total area of ceiling and wall surfaces are more than 75% of its total notional ceiling and wall area. Windows and doors may be counted as open space only if they are locked open to the outside for the duration of trading hours. 10% of the total ceiling and wall area must remain open to the elements at all times.

Since 1 July 2009, smoking in a car with someone under the age of 16 has also been against the law. The Public Health (Tobacco) Act 2008 creates an offence of smoking in a car with a child under 16 years of age in the vehicle. A $250 on-the-spot fine applies to the driver and any passenger who breaks the law. However licence premises may set aside an outdoor smoking area for drinking only and must be 4 metres away from restaurant tables and no more than 75% enclosed.

Since 7 January 2013, smoking has been banned at public (outdoor) playgrounds within 10 metres of children's play equipment, in open areas of public swimming pools, at major sports grounds, within 4 m of any building open to the public and at public transport stops (including outdoor parts of railway stations, bus stops, light rail stops and taxi ranks). Bans on smoking within 4 metres of a pedestrian access point to a public building, including seated areas, restaurants and cafés has been in effect since 6 July 2015.

Smoking has been banned at correctional facilities within the state since 10 August 2015.

Norfolk Island
Smoking is banned in all government buildings, tour buses, taxis and flights to and from Norfolk Island. There is no law on smoking in restaurants, but many are smoke-free; however, they often have a dedicated smoking room for people that wish to smoke. Smoking is permitted in all bars and licensed premises. Resorts and motels have smoking rooms and areas for smokers.

Northern Territory
Certain restrictions on smoking in enclosed areas of restaurants, licensed clubs and pubs came into force in the Northern Territory on 2 January 2010. Areas such as pubs, clubs and restaurants can now only have 50% of their premises a smoking room/area. The Northern Territory is also the last jurisdiction In Australia that still allows smoking inside certain areas of schools providing children do not have access to that area. In the Northern Territory it is common for bars in rural areas to disobey the smoking bans that the government has put into place although fines can be issued ranging from $1000 to $8000.

Northern Territory became the first jurisdiction to ban smoking in correctional facilities when it introduced a total ban on cigarettes in the institutions on 1 July 2013.

Queensland
Queensland banned smoking in all pubs, clubs, restaurants and workplaces, as well as in commercial outdoor eating and drinking areas and in outdoor public places (e.g., patrolled beaches, children's playground equipment, major sport stadiums, and within 4 metres of non-residential building entrances). Since 1 July 2006, premises holding a hotel, club or casino liquor licence can designate up to 50% of the outdoor liquor licensed area as a smoking and drinking area. In this area no food or drink can be served, no food can be consumed, no entertainment can be offered and there must be no gaming machines provided. A "buffer", which can be either a 2-metre-wide area or a 2.1-metre-high screen that is impervious to smoke, must be on the area's perimeter wherever it is adjacent to other parts of the outdoor area usually accessed by patrons. Premises that choose to have such an area must have a smoking management plan for the premises that complies with legislative requirements. For all other  outdoor eating or drinking places, smoking has been prohibited since 1 July 2006. Since 1 January 2010, the Queensland Government banned smoking in cars where children under the age of 16 are present.

In 2014, Queensland banned tobacco in correctional facilities, the second state to do so, but high rates of smoking relapse among people released from prison have led to debate around the effectiveness of this ban in promoting long-term cessation.
Some prisoners in Queensland are getting around the prison smoking bans by creating and smoking "teabacco", which is nicotine patches or lozenges mixed with tea leaves, and rolled up in Bible paper. A forensic analysis of teabacco made from nicotine lozenges identified some potentially toxic compounds, but concluded that teabacco made from nicotine lozenges may be less harmful than traditional tobacco cigarettes.

South Australia
South Australia banned smoking in enclosed public place on 1 November 2007. Under the SA Tobacco Products Regulation Act 1997, a place or area is only "enclosed" if it is fully enclosed or is at least partially covered by a ceiling and has walls such that the total area of the ceiling and wall surfaces exceeds 70 per cent of the total notional ceiling and wall area. It is illegal to smoke in cars while children (under 16) are passengers. Since April 2012, smoking is not allowed beneath covered public transport waiting areas, including bus, tram, train and taxi shelters.

South Australia banned smoking inside prison cells starting in January 2015. Smoking in public outdoor dining areas has been banned in South Australia since July 2016 (the second-to-last state to do so).

Tasmania
Tasmania was the first Australian state to introduce a total indoor smoking ban in January 2006. As of 1 January 2008, smoking in cars with passengers under the age of 18 is banned and will incur a $110 on the spot fine. (The laws would be strictly enforced only after a three-month education period.). Smoking has been banned in all outdoor restaurants since 2012, however outdoor areas of licensed premises are exempt from the ban.

Tasmania has banned smoking in correctional facilities since January 2015.

Victoria

Victoria banned smoking in enclosed public places on 1 July 2007. Smoking is permitted in non-enclosed drinking areas if the area has a roof and walls that cover no more than 75% of the total notional wall area (i.e. if the combined wall and roof space is 25% open to the outdoors). Smoking is also allowed in: balconies; verandas; smoking rooms in motels; private business; courtyards; outdoor shopping malls;  personal living areas in residential care facilities; marquees; and footpaths. Smoking is permitted in high roller rooms and certain smoking rooms of the Crown Casino. The sale of tobacco products to people under 18 is prohibited but there is no age limit to legally possess these products. A ban on smoking in cars carrying children (aged under 18) became effective since 1 January 2010. Smoking is prohibited on all areas of train stations and raised platform tram stops as of 1 March 2014. A ban on smoking within 4 metres school entrances became effective in May 2015.

Victorian has banned smoking in correctional facilities since July 2015.

Effective 1 August 2017, the Tobacco Amendment Act 2016 amended the Tobacco Act 1987 to ban smoking at all outdoor dining areas when food is available for consumption.

Western Australia
Western Australia banned smoking in all indoor areas of pubs, bars and clubs on 31 July 2006. Smoking bans apply in outdoor eating areas, where people eat and/or drink sitting at tables (e.g. restaurants, cafes, delis, lunch-bars and hotels). Smoking is banned within 10 meters of any children's playground equipment. Smoking is prohibited “between the flags” on a beach in patrolled swimming areas. It is also illegal to smoke in a car if a child (aged under 17) is inside. Liquor licensed premises that are not subject to a restaurant licence may set aside up to 50 per cent of outdoor eating areas as smoking zones. Smoking is permitted in the international room and pearl room at the Burswood Casino. The Health Minister has regulated to allow footpath drinking without food to accommodate smokers.

Comparison

References

External links
 Federal, state and territories legislation, University of Sydney
 National Drug Strategy – Household Survey – detailed report 2013, Australian Government, Australian Institute of Health and Welfare
 OURhotel, Special Local Government Edition (Official publication of the Australian Hotels Association), p. 5–7
Environmental Tobacco Smoke in Australia (May 2001), prepared by VicHealth Centre for Tobacco Control. Canberra: Dept. of Health and Ageing. 
 Australian Hotels Association website

Articles containing video clips
Smoking bans
Smoking bans in Australia, List of
Smoking bans, List of
Health law in Australia